Cave S is a limestone cave in the British Overseas Territory of Gibraltar. It is located on the eastern side of the Rock of Gibraltar, near Holy Boy's Cave. Human remains were found in the cave in 1910 that did not appear to be of a modern man.

Description
Captain Sewell discovered what is now known as Cave S or Sewell's Cave. Sewell also gave his name to Sewell's Fig Tree Caves which are now known as Goat's Hair Twin Caves.

The cave provides evidence of marine life indicating that despite its current altitude it was once a sea cave. This is not the only evidence of rising and falling sea levels in Gibraltar which have historically varied greatly.

Wynfrid Duckworth described the cave's floor as falling in height towards the entrance and it was covered in a soil that had the consistency of snuff in 1910. Despite not finding any bats he thought that the snuff-like material was vegetable matter and bat guano. Various human artifacts such as pottery, stone implements and other stone objects, a shell armlet, perforated cyprcea, charcoal, burnt bone and broken shellfish and a wide variety of bird remains and mammalian fauna have been found in the cave. The human bones were thought to come from one male skull-less skeleton which appeared to have notably thick bones.

References
This article uses freely licensed text generously shared by underground-gibraltar.com

Caves of Gibraltar